Whangarei Observatory is associated with the Northland Astronomical Society (NAS), and situated in the Heritage Park grounds, off State Highway 14 in Maunu, Whangarei, New Zealand.

The observatory is open for public viewing evenings every month on the Saturday nearest to the Moon's first quarter phase.

As well as the society's 14" Schmidt-Cassegrain telescope, members also bring along their own telescopes for public viewing.

External links
 Northland Astronomical Society

Astronomical observatories in New Zealand